My Own Holiday is an American rock/blues band from California. The band consists of Joey Chrisman and Nick Bartolo. Currently, they are playing in clubs and are still steadily gathering a fan base. Influences of My Own Holiday include The Stones, Hendrix, Creedence, White Stripes, Black Keys, Dylan, and Petty, among others. The band name came easily, and Chrisman said how everyone wants a holiday, and the band is his and Bartolo's holiday.

Bartolo and Chrisman first met when Chrisman traveled to Florida in order to audition for Bartolo's band. The duo went on tour together and ended up in Los Angeles, then eventually made their way to Lake Arrowhead.

Chrisman, the vocalist and guitarist, moved to Lake Arrowhead when he was 9 years old. He has been playing the guitar for many years and claims to always have had quite an obsession with music, and moved on to write his own music after following the example of other artists, such as Bon Jovi. Chrisman's love of songwriting began in his sixth-grade class, where he wrote lyrics on Post-It notes that covered his desk.

Bartolo, the drummer, also discovered his interest in music at a very young age, when he had a junior drum kit. He taught himself how to play the drums and developed his own style. Bartolo also played with friends in his garage in Florida when he was 14 years old.

My Own Holiday has two released albums, the first titled Even You Out, and the second titled From Noon To Midnight which is being sold at live shows. The band also has released some music videos as well.

References

Musical groups from California
Red Rockets Glare artists